Rhodanthe battii is a species of flowering plant in the family Asteraceae, native to Western Australia.

It was first described by Ferdinand von Mueller in 1893 as Helipterum battii,   but, in 1992 Paul Graham Wilson transferred it to the new genus, Rhodanthe.

References

External links
Rhodanthe battii occurrence data from the Australasian Virtual Herbarium

battii
Flora of Western Australia
Taxa named by Ferdinand von Mueller
Plants described in 1893